Guillaume Pisdoé, also known as Guillaume de Piedoue or Pizdoue was the third Mayor of Paris in 1297 and again in 1304 under Philip IV of France. His son (in 1316) Guillaume II Pisdoé was the First Equerry of the King (Master of Stables), in charge of carrying the Royal Sword of Philip V of France.

Pisdoé Family (alias Piédoüe d'Héritôt)

The Pisdoé family was one of the richest and most powerful Parisian dynasties during the Middle Ages who gave four Mayors to the city of Paris, and numerous municipale magistrates. The Pisdoe used to be one of the main bankers of the Capetian Dynasty during the thirteenth and fourteenth century. They were involved in financing the seventh Crusade, the second part of Notre-Dame de Paris cathedral construction between 1250 and 1345, and the second part of Saint-Germain l'Auxerrois church's construction.

Fifty years later (1358), the Pisdoé financed Etienne Marcel's revolt. Martin Pisdoe, son of Jean Pisdoe, also Mayor of Paris, and Master of Laical Accounts  (head of the Court of Finances) of the King John II of France, and the brother of Guillaume II, intrigated after Marcel's death with his friend Charles the Bad, King of Navarre against the Dauphin (future Charles V) to depose the future king. Martin came to the Louvre to murder the King, but was betrayed before arriving, and was decapitated. The Pisdoé were declared guilty of lèse majesté against King Charles V in 1359 and had to leave Paris for four centuries. The main part of their fortune (Castle of Marcoussis, Castle of Beauvoir, numerous mansions, lands and buildings in Paris, the familial private mansion "La Cour Pavée" extending from Saint-Jacques de la Boucherie church to Place du Chatelet...) and the Pisdoé Bank were impounded by Charles V. The whole family quickly left and settled in Normandy on its land of Héritôt-Ernetôt. Four centuries after, Louis XV decided to forgive the Piédoüe's offenses in memory of their loyalty to the Capetians and elevated Héritôt from a lordship to a marquisate. Each first-born child of the main branch has the title of Marquess of Héritôt-Ernetôt, in addition to their old titles of Viscount of Evrecy, Lord of Nerval, of Harcourt.

External links
The Pisdoe lèse majesté. Letter from King Charles V to Jehan Pisdoé
Martin Pisdoé in "Histoire de France" by Jules Michelet

Mayors of Paris
13th-century French people
14th-century French people